Moore McDowell is an Irish economist and university lecturer. A writer on economics and public finances, he is a regular contributor in the Irish media on the subject of economics.

He is the eldest son of Anthony McDowell, a barrister and civil servant, and Eilis MacNeill (daughter of the leader of the Irish Volunteers, Eoin MacNeill). His younger brother is the politician Senator Michael McDowell.

Moore McDowell studied at University College Dublin (UCD), and was awarded a Research Fellowship from the Economic and Social Research Institute (ESRI) to study at Worcester College, Oxford, from 1967 to 1969. He has held academic positions at UCD, San Francisco State University, University of California at Davis and the University of Delaware.

At UCD like his younger brother, he was a member of Young Fine Gael, the party of their grandfather.

McDowell was one of the economists along with Sean Barrett and Colm McCarthy, nicknamed the 'Doheny & Nesbitt School of Economics', who were closely identified with the early policies of the Progressive Democrats.

References

Year of birth missing (living people)
Living people
21st-century Irish economists
Academics of University College Dublin
Alumni of University College Dublin
University of Delaware faculty
20th-century Irish economists